Alfonso Martínez Domínguez (January 7, 1922 – November 6, 2002) was a Mexican governor of Nuevo León from 1979 to 1985.

Personal life
Son of physician Alfonso Martinez de la Garza and Margarita Rafaela Dominguez Samaniego; grandson of Alfonso Martinez de la Garza and Maria de la Garza. He did his elementary studies in Monterrey, his secondary studies in Mexico city, and he received a bachelor's degree from Franco-Mexican College in Mexico City.

Career
He began governmental career as a clerk (5th category) in Department of the Federal District in 1937; chief editor, He was a Federal Deputy from Federal District 4 from 1946 to 1949. He was a member of the Committee for the Department of the Federal District, 2nd Balloting Committee, Public Works Committee, and the Securities Committee. He was a federal deputy from Federal District 17 from 1952 to 1955 and a member of the Legislative Studies Committee and Tourism Committee. He was a federal deputy from the State of Nuevo León from 1964 to 1967.

He represented District 4, serving as president of the Chamber of Deputies in December 1964. He was President of Gran Commission, member of 1st Committee on Government, Constitutional Affairs Committee; Senator from the state of Nuevo León, 1988–1991; Secretary of organization regional PRI Committee of the Federal District, 1955; secretary of popular action, CEN of PRI, 1946; president of CEN of PRI, 1968–1970; Secretary-General of CNOP of PRI, 1962–1965; Department of Republican Relations, Department of the Federal District, 1970–1971; director general of Airport and Auxiliary services, Secretariat of Communications and Transportation, 1987–1988; Secretary-general Union of Workers of the Department of the Federal District 1942–1943; and author of two books on history.

Resigned from the Federal District after the 1971 student riots in Mexico City; most observers see the resignation as a result of power struggles within the ruling circle rather than just the result of the riots.

Dominguez represented a traditional type of Mexican politician that has almost become extinct. He came from a very poor background and had virtually no education. He received three honorary degrees. He worked his way up through the party hierarchy. Dominguez became the president of the PRI in the 1960s. Known and remembered for his tenacity, focus, passion for his country, Diaz had a reputation of a ruthless politician.

 Mayor of Mexico City in 1971,
 Governor of Nuevo León from 1979
 Senator from 1988, 1997

He served as secretary general of the federal bureaucrats union (FSTSE, 1949 – 1952) and got elected to the Chamber of Deputies on three occasions. He was senator twice and Governor of Nuevo León.

References
Diccionario biográfico del gobierno mexicano, Ed. Fondo de Cultura Económica, Mexico, 1992.

|-

1922 births
2002 deaths
Governors of Nuevo León
Members of the Senate of the Republic (Mexico)
Members of the Chamber of Deputies (Mexico)
Presidents of the Chamber of Deputies (Mexico)
Presidents of the Senate of the Republic (Mexico)
Presidents of the Institutional Revolutionary Party
20th-century Mexican politicians
Politicians from Monterrey